The Golden Reel Award for Outstanding Achievement in Sound Editing – Sound Effects, Foley, Dialogue and ADR for Animated Feature Film is an annual award given by the Motion Picture Sound Editors. It honors sound editors whose work has warranted merit in the field of cinema; in this case, their work in the field of animated film. It was first awarded in 1989, for films released the previous year, under the title Best Sound Editing - Animated Feature. The award has been given with its current title since 2018.

Winners and nominees

1980s
Best Sound Editing - Animated Feature

1990s

2000s

Best Sound Editing - Animated Feature Film, Domestic and Foreign

Best Sound Editing in Animated Features

Best Sound Editing - Sound Effects, Foley, Dialogue and ADR for Feature Film Animation

Best Sound Editing - Sound Effects, Foley, Music, Dialogue and ADR Animation in a Feature Film

2010s
Best Sound Editing - Sound Effects, Foley, Dialogue and ADR in an Animation Feature Film

Outstanding Achievement in Sound Editing - Sound Effects, Foley, Dialogue and ADR for Animated Feature Film

2020s

Sound editors with most wins
Michael Silvers - 8
Randy Thom - 5
Gary Rydstrom - 4

References

External links
Official MPSE Website

Golden Reel Awards (Motion Picture Sound Editors)
Awards for best animated feature film
Awards established in 1989